Nancy Wambui (born 28 July 1986) is a Kenyan long-distance runner.

At the 2002 World Cross Country Championships she finished thirteenth in the short race, while the Kenyan team of which Wambui was a part finished second of the team competition. She then finished fourteenth at the 2006 World Cross Country Championships, but that was not enough to win a medal with the team.

Personal bests
5000 metres - 15:22.0 min (2001)

External links

1986 births
Living people
Kenyan female long-distance runners
Place of birth missing (living people)
Kenyan female cross country runners
21st-century Kenyan women